Weston Collegiate Institute (Weston C.I., WCI, Weston) is a Grade 9 to 12 public high school in Toronto, Ontario, Canada. It was formerly known by its previous names of Weston Grammar School, Weston High School, Weston High and Vocational School and Weston Collegiate and Vocational School. It is located in the York South-Weston area. It is the second oldest high school in Toronto, after Jarvis Collegiate Institute. Weston CI is located on 100 Pine Street and has a student population of about 1043.

History
Weston Collegiate Institute holds the distinction of being the second-oldest secondary school in Toronto and the oldest in the former City of York, having been established in 1857 as Weston Grammar School. The school's activities and scholarships are supported by the Weston's Alumni Foundation. The school was renamed to Weston High School in 1871, then Weston High and Vocational School in 1922, and lastly to Weston Collegiate and Vocational School in 1939 before adopting its present name in 1965.

WCI displays an international focus as the student body representing over 80 countries in the world. The diversity within WCI is reflected in its school activities and clubs.  The school also strives to meet the needs of all students, with programs that prepare students for universities, colleges, and skills trade that lead to work or apprenticeship.

The original school building on King Street was built in 1858 and was replaced in January 1876 after the fire burned the original school on March 23, 1875. The enlarged school, Collegiate Gothic, designed by architect Stephen Burwell Coon, was built in 1913 facing William Street with six classrooms, an office, a science lab and an gymnatorium. In 1952-53, the building gained additional features such as more classrooms, auditorium, cafeteria, library, gymnasium, offices and music room. The school's modern facility was constructed in 1968 in the old track and field and was opened in September 1970. The brutalist building includes a library, auditorium, a large indoor pool, a full-sized field with surrounding track, a double gymnasium and a fitness/weight room.

In 2017, the school celebrated its 160th anniversary.

International Baccalaureate program

The International Baccalaureate Program (also known as the IB Program) is a holistic, world-renowned Graduate Diploma recognized by universities internationally. It was introduced by then IB Coordinator, Mr. Gary Hophan, in March 1994 to Weston.  The present coordinator is Ms. Anne Dale. All the teachers are specially selected and trained to support the International Baccalaureate program.

The process of applying involves a personal essay about a quote of some sort and successful essays' applicants will then be called in for an interview. Judged on both assessments (and a completed application package which involves report cards, etc.) the applicant will be given or rejected a spot in the program. The interview typically lasts 20–30 minutes and admission is given on the spot. Admission is usually highly selective and only 90 spots are available per year.

The IB Program at Weston Collegiate Institute is taught in English and taken in the latter two years of high school (i.e. Grades 11 and 12). However, due to its rigorous nature, Weston Collegiate Institute offers the Preparatory International Baccalaureate Program (also known as the Pre-IB Program) to students. The Pre-IB Program is largely recommended to students, but entry into the IB program without Pre-IB may be accepted. All IB courses are offered at the enriched level, which  greatly exceeds the expectations of the Ontario Secondary School curriculum. By Grade 12, all students study at the university-level, leading some universities to offer advanced standing for Higher Level subjects.

Students who are enrolled in the IB program receive both the International Baccalaureate Diploma and the Ontario Secondary School Diploma upon successful completion. Students are expected to study 3 subjects at the Higher Level (HL) and 3 at the Standard Level (SL). Students may also opt to complete 4 HL and 2 SL subjects if they wish although it is not recommended due to the potential for the exorbitant workload Successful completion of the IB program entails receiving passing grades on all written IB examinations, the Theory of Knowledge essay, and the Extended Essay, as well as 150 hours of volunteered community involvement in three areas (i.e. creativity, action, service; also known as CAS hours). In their final year, students write the official IB exams in May.

All IB students from Weston Collegiate Institute are accepted to their first choice universities and are offered substantial scholarships. In fact, the IB Department at Weston Collegiate Institute provides a number of IB Scholarships for outstanding IB students. Recipients are nominated by IB teachers, administrators, or students and selected by a committee of 5 members (i.e. IB Coordinator, 3 teachers, IB Parent Council parent representatives). The IB Scholarships are broken into the following categories: IB Ideal, Leadership, Most Improved, Creativity, Service, Academic.

Each year,  the Grade 12 students, with the help of the IB Coordinator, organize a 3-day trip to Algonquin Park which includes the newly arrived Grade 9's. The purpose of this trip is to help the new students transition to high school and to foster a sense of community. Weston also offers IB tutoring by advanced students to support new students academically. Furthermore, the IB Department, which includes the students, teachers, and coordinator, organizes an annual IB Multicultural Evening and Fundraiser to raise money to support the IB Scholarships and the Annual Algonquin Park trip. Many Weston Collegiate Institute IB Alumni and their friends and family are invited to this event.

Current IB subjects offered 

In order to graduate as a diploma student, an IB candidate must take one (or two) science course(s), one math course, and one higher-level English course, Theory of Knowledge, as well as one secondary language (only French is offered at Weston).

Experimental Sciences
Biology HL
Biology SL
Chemistry HL
Chemistry SL
Physics SL

Mathematics
Math Studies SL
Mathematics SL
Languages A1, A2, BEnglish A1 HL (required)
French B HL
French B SLIndividuals and SocietiesSocio-Cultural Anthropology HL
Socio-Cultural Anthropology SL
Information Technology in a Global Society SL
Information Technology in a Global Society HL
Theory of Knowledge (ToK; required) 

Athletics

 Cricket (indoors and outdoors)
 Football
 Basketball
 Soccer (indoors and outdoors)
 Baseball
 Golf
 Swimming

 Badminton
 Rugby
 Ice Hockey
 Volleyball (Co-ed)

 Cross-Country
 Track and Field
 Softball
 Slo-pitch

 Arts 

 Dance Club
 Dramatic Arts Festivals
 Live Production/Plays
 Talent Shows
 Music Concert/Performances

 Computer/Graphic Arts
 Film/Video Workshops
 Media Art
 Photography

 Choir
 Ensemble
 Jazz Band
 Orchestra
 Strings

 Other recreational/co-curricular activities 

 Student Activity Council (SAC)
 Weston Heritage Club (WHC)
 French Club
 Queer Straight Alliance (QSA)
 Spanish Club
 ESL Club
 Sound, Light and Stage Crew Club
 Chess Club
 HSERT (High School Emergency Response Team)

 Student Newspaper Club
 Yearbook Club
 Weston Ambassadors
 Best Buddies
 Robotics Club
 Computer Club/Team
 Weight Training Club
 Weston Heritage Club
 Dominoes Club

 Athletic Council
 Future Aces
 GO Club
 Student Council
 Truth and Recoconciliation Committee
 Music Council
 Black Student Union
 Weston Cares for Children
 Eco Club (Highly esteemed and respected extra-curricular within the school)
 Christian Club

 Community Fundraisers Terry Fox Run
 UNICEF
 United Way
 CN Tower Climb
 30 Hour Famine
 Canadian Cancer Society
 Free the ChildrenCaring Blood Drive
 Parenting Education in the Classroom
 Settlement Education Partnership Toronto (SEPT)
 Somali Youth Association of Toronto(SOYAT)
 Women's HabitatSafe & Caring Schools'''
 Empowered Student Partnerships (ESP)
 Kids Help Phone
 Let's Stop the Bullying: Bully Prevention Program
 Me to We
 Parks and Recreation After school program
 Recognition Assemblies
 Recognition Awards Program
 Restorative Justice
 YOUCAN: Team Toronto, Peace Builders

Notable faculty
Bob Nadin – Ice hockey referee, and IIHF Hall of Fame inductee

Notable alumni
Esmond Butler – private secretary of Governor General (1954-1984), received Order of Canada in 1986
Ed Chadwick – former goaltender with the Toronto Maple Leafs and Boston Bruins
Sir James Alexander Lougheed – Northwest Territories/Alberta senator and federal cabinet minister
Carline Muir – track and field athlete, competed in 2008 Beijing Olympics
William Paris – fighter pilot and trainer of pilots, receive the Order of Canada in 1989
Vera Peters – medical doctor, received Order of Canada in 1975
Bob Pulford – NHL hockey player
Sinclair Stevens (1927–2016) – lawyer, businessman and Federal Cabinet minister
Carole Taylor – former Chair of the Board of Directors of the CBC and politician
Elwy Yost (1925–2011) – TV Ontario movie reviewer

See also
List of high schools in Ontario

References 

 Listed among "top 75 schools" by the University of Toronto 1996 Ontario Biology Competition 
 Listed as #52 in the University of Toronto's 2000 National Biology Competition
 participated in 2000 Toronto "In the Driver's seat" safety program
 Student received a 1996 Canada Governor General's Academic Medal (Bronze)
 Student received a 1994 Canada Governor General's Academic Medal (Bronze)
 News story about 150th anniversary

External links
 Weston C.I. Official site
 Weston Alumni Foundation Official site
 Weston CI TDSB Site
 International Baccalaureate listing

Schools in the TDSB
High schools in Toronto
International Baccalaureate schools in Ontario
Educational institutions established in 1857
1857 establishments in Ontario